Martin Luther Urquhart (4 June 1883 – 3 November 1961) was a Liberal party member of the House of Commons of Canada. He was born in Waugh's River, Nova Scotia and became a grocery wholesaler.

He was first elected to Parliament at the Colchester riding in the 1930 general election. After completing his only federal term, the 17th Canadian Parliament, Urquhart left federal politics and did not seek another term in the 1935 election.

Personal life 
His wife was Carrie Drysdale. He died in 1961.

References

1883 births
1961 deaths
20th-century Canadian businesspeople
Liberal Party of Canada MPs
Members of the House of Commons of Canada from Nova Scotia

Canadian grocers